In Greek mythology, Deipyle (Dēipulē) may refer to:

Deipyle, daughter of Adrastus and Amphithea, wife of Tydeus and mother of Diomedes. Her sister Argea married Polynices. Servius and Hyginus call her Deiphile.
Deipyle or Deityche, mother of Eurypylus by Euaemon. In some accounts, the consort of Euaemon was called Ops.

Notes

References 

 Apollodorus, The Library with an English Translation by Sir James George Frazer, F.B.A., F.R.S. in 2 Volumes, Cambridge, MA, Harvard University Press; London, William Heinemann Ltd. 1921. ISBN 0-674-99135-4. Online version at the Perseus Digital Library. Greek text available from the same website.
 Gaius Julius Hyginus, Fabulae from The Myths of Hyginus translated and edited by Mary Grant. University of Kansas Publications in Humanistic Studies. Online version at the Topos Text Project.
 Maurus Servius Honoratus, In Vergilii carmina comentarii. Servii Grammatici qui feruntur in Vergilii carmina commentarii; recensuerunt Georgius Thilo et Hermannus Hagen. Georgius Thilo. Leipzig. B. G. Teubner. 1881. Online version at the Perseus Digital Library.

Princesses in Greek mythology
Queens in Greek mythology
Argive characters in Greek mythology